Anwar Cabinet may refers to:
 Anwar Ibrahim Cabinet
 Anwar Tjokroaminoto Cabinet